Büşra Kılıçlı (née Cansu; born 16 July 1990 in Gölcük) is a Turkish volleyball player. She currently plays for Türk Hava Yolları and wears number 12. She is regular Turkish national team player, including at the 2012 Summer Olympics.

Awards

Individuals
 2015 Montreux Volley Masters "2nd Best Middle Blocker"

Clubs
 2011 Turkish Volleyball Super Cup -  Champion, with Eczacıbaşı VitrA
 2011-12 Turkish Cup -  Champion, with Eczacıbaşı VitrA
 2011-12 Aroma Women's Volleyball League -  Champion, with Eczacıbaşı VitrA
 2012 Turkish Volleyball Super Cup -  Champion, with Eczacıbaşı VitrA
 2012-2013 Turkish Women's Volleyball Cup -  Runner-Up, with Eczacıbaşı VitrA
 2012-2013 Turkish Women's Volleyball League -  Runner-Up, with Eczacıbaşı VitrA
 2014-15 CEV Champions League -  Champion, with Eczacıbaşı VitrA
 2015 FIVB Volleyball Women's Club World Championship -  Champion, with Eczacıbaşı VitrA

National team
 2011 European Championship -  Bronze Medal
 2012 FIVB World Grand Prix -  Bronze Medal
 2013 Mediterranean Games - 
 2015 European Games -

Personal life
On August 2, 2015, Büşra Cansu married national basketball player Deniz Kılıçlı.

See also
 Turkish women in sports

References

External links
 
 
 

1990 births
Living people
Turkish women's volleyball players
Eczacıbaşı volleyball players
Olympic volleyball players of Turkey
Volleyball players at the 2012 Summer Olympics
European Games gold medalists for Turkey
European Games medalists in volleyball
Volleyball players at the 2015 European Games
Mediterranean Games silver medalists for Turkey
Competitors at the 2013 Mediterranean Games
Mediterranean Games medalists in volleyball
People from Kocaeli Province